MacColl Island is one of the many uninhabited Canadian arctic islands in Qikiqtaaluk Region, Nunavut. It is located at the confluence of Hudson Strait and the Labrador Sea.

It is a member of the Button Islands, situated west of and parallel to Lawson Island. Other islands in the immediate vicinity include Erhardt Island, Holdridge Island, King Island, Leading Island, and Observation Island.

References 

Islands of Hudson Strait
Islands of the Labrador Sea
Uninhabited islands of Qikiqtaaluk Region